In the mathematical area of group theory, Artin groups, also known as Artin–Tits groups or generalized braid groups, are a family of infinite discrete groups defined by simple presentations. They are closely related with Coxeter groups. Examples are free groups, free abelian groups, braid groups, and right-angled Artin–Tits groups, among others.

The groups are named after Emil Artin, due to his early work on braid groups in the 1920s to 1940s, and Jacques Tits who developed the theory of a more general class of groups in the 1960s.

Definition 

An Artin–Tits group is a group that admits an Artin–Tits presentation. Likewise, an Artin–Tits monoid is a monoid that, as a monoid, admits an Artin–Tits presentation.

By convention, one puts  when there is no relation  .

 

The integers  can be organized into a symmetric matrix, known as the Coxeter matrix of the group.

Conversely, if  is a Coxeter group presented by reflections and the relations  are removed, the extension thus obtained is an Artin–Tits group.

Examples 

General properties 

Artin–Tits monoids are eligible for Garside methods based on the investigation of their divisibility relations, and are well understood:

 Artin–Tits monoids are cancellative, and they admit greatest common divisors and conditional least common multiples (a least common multiple exists whenever a common multiple does).

Very few results are known for general Artin–Tits groups. In particular, the following basic questions remain open in the general case:

– solving the word and conjugacy problems — which are conjectured to be decidable,

– determining torsion — which is conjectured to be trivial,

– determining the center — which is conjectured to be trivial or monogenic in the case when the group is not a direct product ("irreducible case"),

– determining the cohomology — in particular solving the  conjecture, i.e., finding an acyclic complex whose fundamental group is the considered group.

Partial results involving particular subfamilies are gathered below. Among the few known general results, one can mention:

 Artin–Tits groups are infinite countable.
 Every (finitely generated) Artin–Tits monoid admits a finite Garside family (Matthew Dyer and Christophe Hohlweg). As a consequence, the existence of common right-multiples in Artin–Tits monoids is decidable, and reduction of multifractions is effective.

Particular classes of Artin–Tits groups 

Several important classes of Artin groups can be defined in terms of the properties of the Coxeter matrix.

Artin–Tits groups of spherical type 

 An Artin–Tits group is said to be of spherical type if the associated Coxeter group  is finite — the alternative terminology "Artin–Tits group of finite type" is to be avoided, because of its ambiguity: a "finite type group" is just one that admits a finite generating set.
 In the case of a spherical Artin–Tits group, the group is a group of fractions for the monoid, making the study much easier. Every above-mentioned problem is solved in the positive for spherical Artin–Tits groups: the word and conjugacy problems are decidable, their torsion is trivial, the center is  monogenic in the irreducible case, and the cohomology is determined (Pierre Deligne, by geometrical methods, Egbert Brieskorn and Kyoji Saito, by combinatorial methods ).
 Artin–Tits groups of spherical type are biautomatic groups (Ruth Charney).

Right-angled Artin groups 

The names (free) partially commutative group, graph group, trace group, semifree group or even locally free group are also common.
 For this class of Artin–Tits groups, a different labeling scheme is commonly used.
 The class of right-angled Artin–Tits groups includes the free groups of finite rank, corresponding to a graph with no edges, and the finitely-generated free abelian groups, corresponding to a complete graph. Every right-angled Artin group of rank r can be constructed as HNN extension of a right-angled Artin group of rank , with the free product and direct product as the extreme cases. A generalization of this construction is called a graph product of groups. A right-angled Artin group is a special case of this product, with every vertex/operand of the graph-product being a free group of rank one (the infinite cyclic group).
 The word and conjugacy problems of a right-angled Artin–Tits group are decidable, the former in linear time, the group is torsion-free, and there is an explicit cellular finite  (John Crisp, Eddy Godelle, and Bert Wiest).
 Every right-angled Artin–Tits group acts freely and cocompactly on a finite-dimensional CAT(0) cube complex, its "Salvetti complex". As an application, one can use right-angled Artin groups and their Salvetti complexes to construct groups with given finiteness properties (Mladen Bestvina and Noel Brady ) see also (Ian Leary ).

Artin–Tits groups of large type 

 An Artin–Tits group (and a Coxeter group) is said to be of large type if  for all generators ; it is said to be of extra-large type if  for all generators .
 Artin–Tits groups of extra-large type are eligible for small cancellation theory. As an application, Artin–Tits groups of extra-large type are torsion-free and have solvable conjugacy problem (Kenneth Appel and Paul  Schupp).
 Artin–Tits groups of extra-large type are biautomatic (David Peifer).
 Artin groups of large type are shortlex automatic with regular geodesics (Derek Holt and Sarah Rees).

Other types 

Many other families of Artin–Tits groups have been identified and investigated. Here we mention two of them.

Such groups act cocompactly on a CAT(0) cubical complex, and, as a consequence, one can find a rational normal form for their elements and deduce a solution to the word problem (Joe Altobelli and Charney ). An alternative normal form is provided by multifraction reduction, which gives a unique expression by an irreducible multifraction directly extending the expression by an irreducible fraction in the spherical case (Dehornoy).
 An Artin–Tits group is said to be of affine type if the associated Coxeter group is affine. Affine Artin–Tits groups are of Euclidean type: the associated Coxeter group acts geometrically on a Euclidean space. As a consequence, their center is trivial, and their word problem is decidable (Jon McCammond and Robert Sulway ). In 2019, a proof of the  conjecture was announced for all affine Artin–Tits groups (Mario Salvetti and Giovanni Paolini).

See also 
 Free partially commutative monoid
 Artinian group (an unrelated notion)
 Non-commutative cryptography
 Elementary abelian group

References

Further reading 

 
 
 
 

Braid groups